NGC 731 is an elliptical galaxy located in the constellation of Cetus about 172 million light-years away from the Milky Way. It was discovered by William Herschel on January 10, 1785.

References

External links 
 

Cetus (constellation)
731
Elliptical galaxies
007118